The Immigration, Asylum and Nationality Act 2006 (c 13) is an Act of the Parliament of the United Kingdom.

It is the fifth major piece of legislation relating to immigration and asylum since 1993.

Commencement Orders
Although the Act received Royal Assent on 30 March, its provisions did not take effect immediately, until a series of commencement orders brought the provisions into force incrementally:
The Immigration, Asylum and Nationality Act 2006 (Commencement No. 1) Order 2006 (S.I. 2006/1497 (C. 50)), made on 2 June 2006, brought into force on 16 June 2006 the sections on grants, proof of right of abode, accommodation, removal: cancellation of leave, deprivation of citizenship, deprivation of right of abode, and money. It also repealed section 40A(3) of the British Nationality Act 1981.
The Immigration, Asylum and Nationality Act 2006 (Commencement No. 2) Order 2006 (S.I. 2006/2226 (C. 75)), made on 13 August 2006, enacted the bulk of the Act's provisions including the sections on variation of leave to enter or remain, removal, grounds of appeal, failure to provide documents, refusal of leave to enter, deportation, continuation of leave, consequential amendments, code of practice, discrimination: code of practice, documents produced or found, fingerprinting, attendance for fingerprinting, searches: contracting out, information: embarking passengers, inspection of detention facilities, capacity to make nationality application, arrest pending deportation, refugee convention: construction, refugee convention:certification, detained persons: national minimum wage. It also repealed sections of the Prison Act 1952 (c.52),the Immigration Act 1971 (c.77), the Anti-terrorism, Crime and Security Act 2001 and the Nationality, Immigration and Asylum Act 2002 (c.41).
The Immigration, Asylum and Nationality Act 2006 (Commencement No. 3) Order 2006 (S.I. 2006/2838 (C. 98)), made on 4 December 2006, enacted the remainder of the Act's provisions including the sections on abandonment of appeal and acquisition of British nationality.

Summary of changes

Appeals
The Act introduced a number of changes to the immigration appeals process, most notably restricting the right of appeal for refusal of entry clearance in cases where the subject intends to enter the country as a dependent, a visitor or a student.

This leaves the only grounds for appeal open to human rights and race discrimination reasons. Appeals launched within the UK can be for asylum cases only.

Employment
The Act introduces civil (not criminal) penalties in the form of fines for employers who take on people over the age of 16 who are subject to immigration control (that is, have no entry clearance or leave to remain, or no valid permit to work in the UK).

Information
The Act allows immigration officers to request and obtain biometric data (such as fingerprints) from immigration arrivals for the purposes of proving they are the rightful holder of their passport or travel documents.

It allows the police to request and obtain advance information on passengers and crew of flights and ships arriving in or leaving the United Kingdom, or those expected to do so.

The Act requires the Asylum and Immigration Tribunal and the Special Immigration Appeals Commission to first consider if an application for refugee status meets article 1F of the Convention Relating to the Status of Refugees, if the decision by the Home Secretary is to refuse on that basis.

Citizenship and Right of Abode
The Act contains several provisions empowering the Home Secretary to deprive a person of British citizenship (or Right of Abode) if it is considered that such deprivation is "conducive to the public good".

Notable applications of the Act
Australian Guantánamo Bay inmate David Matthew Hicks applied for British citizenship in 2005 after the previous 2002 legislation allowed citizenship by virtue of maternal heritage. It was considered that the British government may petition for his release as had been done for other British nationals. After a lengthy court battle with the Home Office, Hicks was granted British citizenship on 5 July 2006, but then stripped of it several hours later under section 56 of the Act allowing the Home Secretary to "deprive a person of a citizenship status if the Secretary of State is satisfied that deprivation is conducive to the public good."
Anna Chapman

See also
British nationality law
History of British nationality law

References

External links
Emplaw.co.uk website: Immigration, Asylum and Nationality Act 2006

UK Legislation 

Explanatory notes to the Immigration, Asylum and Nationality Act 2006.

United Kingdom Acts of Parliament 2006
Immigration law in the United Kingdom
British nationality law
Right of asylum legislation in the United Kingdom
Immigration legislation